WKZK (The Spirit 103.7 FM & 1600 AM) is an urban gospel music formatted radio station licensed to North Augusta, South Carolina.

External links 
WKZK — official website

Gospel radio stations in the United States
Radio stations established in 1962
KZK